The 1947 Lane Dragons football team, also sometimes known as the "Red Dragons", was an American football team that represented Lane College in the Southern Intercollegiate Athletic Conference (SIAC) during the 1947 college football season. In their 11th season under head coach Edward Clemon, the Dragons compiled a 6–5 record, lost to Bethune–Cookman in the Flower Bowl, and outscored all opponents by a total of 194 to 87.  The team was ranked No. 18 among the nation's black college football teams according to the Pittsburgh Courier and its Dickinson Rating System.  The team played its home games at Lane College Athletic Field and Rothrock Field, both located in Jackson, Tennessee.

Key players included Wild Bill Battles at quarterback, team captain Alex Moore at tackle, Country Reeves at center, and William Green at fullback.

Schedule

References

Lane
Lane Dragons football seasons
Lane Dragons football